Deborah Holland is an American-Canadian singer-songwriter. She rose to national prominence in 1987 as the lead singer and songwriter of Animal Logic featuring Stanley Clarke and Stewart Copeland.

As of March 2020, Deborah Holland has released six solo albums: Freudian Slip (1994), The Panic Is On (1997), The Book of Survival (1999), Bad Girl Once… (2006), Vancouver (2013), and Fine, Thank You! (2019).

In 2007, Holland formed The Refugees with Cidny Bullens and Wendy Waldman. As of January 2020, The Refugees have released two albums, Unbound (2009) and Three (2012); and the EP How Far It Goes in 2019.

Early life and education
Holland grew up in Passaic and Clifton, New Jersey. She began learning piano at age 5 from her father, Irwin Heilner, who was a composer and songwriter.

At age 14 she began playing the guitar, writing songs, and performing in New Jersey and New York City. She appeared twice on Izzy Young's Folk Show on WBAI and in 1969 her song, "When I Hear About War" was published in Broadside magazine. She attended the New Lincoln School in New York City (Grades 11-12) where she studied music with Philip Corner and Cathy MacDonald, and also took classes at the Mannes School of Music.

She briefly attended the Berklee College of Music and later received her B.A. in Jazz Studies at Livingston College (Rutgers University) where she studied with, and was mentored by, jazz pianist Kenny Barron.

In 1977 Holland moved to Los Angeles to pursue her career. In 1996 she became the first student to earn a master's degree in Commercial Music from California State University, Los Angeles and in 1997 joined the faculty; running the Master's in Commercial Music from 1998-2010.

Music career

Animal Logic (1987–1991)
In 1987, Holland won the audition to be the lead singer and songwriter of Animal Logic, after a two-song demo tape was forwarded to Police drummer Stewart Copeland by publisher Dan Howell. She was selected over hundreds of other singers who auditioned for the band. Holland is credited with writing nearly all the songs recorded by the group.

Animal Logic released their debut album Animal Logic in 1989, peaking at No. 106 on the Billboard 200. A second album, Animal Logic II was released in 1991.

Both albums featured guest appearances from well-known musicians, including: Jackson Browne, David Lindley, George Duke, Steve Howe and Freddie Hubbard.

The band toured and appeared on The David Letterman Show, The Tonight Show, and had videos on MTV and VH1.

In a March 2020 interview with sterwartcopeland.com, Deborah confirmed that Animal Logic has been working on material for a new EP: “We’re in the process of finishing up five songs though the bulk of the work is now on Stanley’s shoulders and he has a crazy schedule so it may take a while.”

Solo recordings (1988–2007)
In the years following the demise of Animal Logic, Holland released five solo albums, and has recorded and performed music for movies, television and commercials.

In 1988 Deborah recorded "Come To Me" from the movie Fright Night Part 2. She also contributed to the I.R.S. Records compilation Just In Time For Christmas (1990), providing the song "It Only Comes Once a Year".

She has scored five films, including Circuitry Man, and has had two collaborations with Stewart Copeland used in films; "Heaven is a Place" in the 1991 movie Highlander II: The Quickening, and "For One Moment" in the 1992 television movie Afterburn.

More recently, Holland's songs have appeared in the television shows Keeping Up with the Kardashians, My Name Is Earl, and Longmire.

The Refugees (2007–2012)
In 2007 Holland formed a folk supergroup called The Refugees, with Wendy Waldman and Cidny Bullens.  The group released their first album Unbound in 2009, which won the International Acoustic Music Award for Best Album. The Refugees' second album, Three, was released in 2012 and made the Folk DJs' Top 20 charts as well as charting on Roots Music Report's TOP 50 Folk charts. The trio toured extensively throughout the U.S. and in Canada appearing at venues, arts centers, folk clubs, and festivals, including the Philadelphia Folk Festival, Wheatland Music Festival, Canmore Folk Festival, the Iowa Women's Music Festival and more.

Vancouver (2013)
Holland's most recent album, Vancouver, was released June 2013. The album is her first CanCon recording and received international radio play. The record charted for over nine months on Roots Music Report's Top 50 Americana/Roots chart and Galaxie Music's Canadian Folk charts. The song “Home” made the finals of the International Acoustic Music Awards.

Fine, Thank You! (2020)

On March 23, 2019 Deborah made the announcement on her official Facebook page that she was working on 2 new EPs - a solo release for 2020, and one with Animal Logic with no set release date.

On Feb 25, 2020 it was announced that Deborah would release her sixth solo album, Fine, Thank You on March 27. The six song offering was produced by Winston Hauschild and features performances by Stewart Copeland (on four tracks), JUNO-winning backup vocalist Shari Ulrich, and Patterson Barrett on pedal steel.

Personal life
After receiving a master's degree from California State University, Los Angeles, Holland joined the faculty, running the Master's in Commercial Music program from 1998 to 2010.

In 2010, Holland relocated from Los Angeles to Vancouver, BC. In 2011, Holland began teaching songwriting at Langara College in Vancouver.

Discography

Solo albums 
 1994 – Freudian Slip
 1997 – The Panic is On
 1999 – The Book of Survival
 2006 – Bad Girl Once
 2013 – Vancouver
 2020 – Fine, Thank You!

With Animal Logic
 1989 – Animal Logic
 1991 – Animal Logic II

With The Refugees
 2009 – Unbound
 2012 – Three (2011 album)

Compilation albums
 1990 - “Just In Time For Christmas” – IRS Records Compilation

References

External links
Official website
Official site for The Refugees
1999 Story and Interview
1989 Story and Interview
Review of "The Book Of Survival"

1954 births
American women singer-songwriters
American folk guitarists
American folk singers
California State University, Los Angeles alumni
California State University, Los Angeles faculty
Guitarists from Los Angeles
Living people
Musicians from Philadelphia
Rutgers University alumni
Singers from Los Angeles
Singer-songwriters from Pennsylvania
20th-century American guitarists
Langara College people
20th-century American women guitarists
Singer-songwriters from California
21st-century American women